Kehelwaththa is a village in Sri Lanka. It is located within Sabaragamuwa Province.

External links

Populated places in Kegalle District
Geography of Kegalle District